The 1998 Presidents Cup was held 11–13 December in Australia at the Royal Melbourne Golf Club in Black Rock, Victoria, a suburb southeast of Melbourne. The International team won the competition by a margin of 20–11. This was the first time the International team won the competition, and through 2022, is their sole victory. The honorary chairman was Australian Prime Minister John Howard. It was the third Presidents Cup competition and the first held outside the United States. The competition returned to Royal Melbourne in 2011 and 2019

Format
Both teams had 12 players plus a non-playing captain. On the first and second day foursomes were played in the morning and four-ball was played in the afternoon. On the third day only singles were played.

Teams
Masashi "Jumbo" Ozaki, who was aged 51, decided not to play in the event. He finished fourth in the International team rankings. This meant that his brother, Naomichi "Joe" Ozaki, who finished 11th in the rankings, made the team automatically. Hal Sutton finished 8th in the United States rankings but withdrew in early December following the death of his father-in-law. He was replaced by Lee Janzen who was the highest ranked player not already in the team.

OWGR as of 6 December 1998, the last ranking before the Cup

Friday's matches

Morning foursomes

Afternoon four-ball

Saturday's matches

Morning foursomes

Afternoon four-ball

Sunday's matches

Singles

Individual player records
Each entry refers to the win–loss–half record of the player.

International

United States

External links
Official scores
Royal Melbourne Golf Club

Presidents Cup
Golf tournaments in Australia
Sports competitions in Melbourne
Presidents Cup
Presidents Cup
Presidents Cup